"The Circus Bee" is a circus march, or screamer, composed by Henry Fillmore in February 1908. It is a technically advanced composition and is used as openers and encores in concerts.

"The Circus Bee" was a celebration of sorts for the fact that Henry Fillmore and his father, who managed their publishing business, finally agreed that the young composer could publish his music "at home" even though it did not meet the elder Fillmore's standard of being religious music. The march is named after an imaginary circus newspaper and reflects Fillmore's lifelong interest in circuses and his varied experiences while touring with five different big top shows.

Circus music
March music
1908 songs